Calas may refer to:

Calas (food), a popular breakfast food in New Orleans
Calas (general), a general and satrap of Alexander the Great
Calas (surname)
CALAS, Canadian Association for Laboratory Animal Science

See also 
 Callas (disambiguation)
 Kalas (disambiguation)